The 115th Indian Infantry Brigade is an infantry formation of the Indian Army.
It was initially formed during World War II, in September 1943, as a training brigade of the 39th Indian Infantry Division.

Its composition included the 14th Gurkha Rifles Training Battalion, the 38th Gurkha Rifles Training Battalion, the 56th Gurkha Rifles Training Battalion, and the 710th Gurkha Rifles Training Battalion.

In 1971 it was part of the 36th Division. In the late 1980s the brigade took part in the Indian Peace Keeping Force in Sri Lanka. As of 2001, the brigade, as part of the reformed 36th Division, a Reorganised Army Plains Infantry Division (RAPID), was located at Dhana.

See also

 List of Indian Army Brigades in World War II

References

Further reading 
Richard A. Renaldi and Ravi Rikhe, 'Indian Army Order of Battle,' Orbat.com for Tiger Lily Books: A division of General Data LLC, 2011

British Indian Army brigades
115
Military units and formations established in 1943
Military units and formations in Burma in World War II